Pyrgocythara angulosa is a species of sea snail, a marine gastropod mollusk in the family Mangeliidae.

Description

Distribution
This species occurs in the Pacific Ocean off Mexico.

References

 McLean, J.H. & Poorman, R. (1971) New species of tropical Eastern Pacific Turridae. The Veliger, 14, 89–11

External links
 American Museum of Natural History: Pyrgocythara angulosa
 

angulosa
Gastropods described in 1971